The 2014 Dafabet Champion of Champions was a professional non-ranking snooker tournament that took place between 3 and 9 November 2014 at the Ricoh Arena in Coventry, England.

Ronnie O'Sullivan successfully defended his title beating Judd Trump 10–7 in the final.

Prize fund
The breakdown of prize money for this year is shown below:

 Winner: £100,000
 Runner-up: £50,000
 Semi-finals: £20,000
 Group runner-up: £10,000
 Group semi-finals: £5,000
 Total: £270,000

Players
Players qualified for the event by winning important tournaments since the previous Champion of Champions. Entry was guaranteed for the defending champion, winners of rankings events and winners of the following non-rankings events: 2014 Masters, 2014 Championship League, 2015 World Grand Prix and 2014 Players Championship Grand Final. Remaining places were then allocated to winners of European Tour events (in the order they were played) and then to winners of Asian Tour events and then, winners of the 2014 Six-red World Championship, 2014 Snooker Shoot-Out and 2013 World Seniors Championship.

Only 13 different players won one the 24 qualifying tournaments. The remaining three places were allocated to the three highest ranked players who had not already qualified, based on the world rankings after the 2014 Bulgarian Open.

The following 16 players qualified for the tournament:

Main draw

Final

Century breaks

 139, 137, 134, 125, 115, 109, 105, 103  Ronnie O'Sullivan
 134, 117, 111, 106  Neil Robertson
 119, 106, 102, 100  Judd Trump
 112  Barry Hawkins
 111, 105  Ding Junhui
 107  Stuart Bingham

Notes

References

External links 

 

2014
2014 in snooker
2014 in English sport
Sports competitions in Coventry
2010s in Coventry
November 2014 sports events in the United Kingdom